Rezwan Ferdaus (born 1985) is a United States citizen of Bangladeshi descent who is serving a federal prison sentence after pleading guilty to terrorism charges in 2012.

Biography
Ferdaus was born and raised in Ashland, Massachusetts. He had two previous arrests, one for a high school prank during which he and other students poured cement on in front of the school doors, and the other for marijuana possession. Ferdaus studied physics at Northeastern University in Boston.

Arrest
An undercover FBI agent infiltrated Ferdaus' local mosque, and coaxed him into agreeing to participate in a terror attack, despite being aware he had a mental disability.

Ferdaus was arrested by the Federal Bureau of Investigation on September 28, 2011, for plotting to attack The Pentagon and the United States Capitol Building with remote-controlled model aircraft packed with C-4 explosives. He was also charged with supporting Al-Qaeda by plotting attacks on American soldiers abroad and making detonators for improvised explosive devices.

Guilty plea and sentencing
On July 20, 2012, Ferdaus pleaded guilty to the following charges in Federal District Court in Boston, Massachusetts:
Conspiracy to destroy national defense premises
Conspiracy to damage and destroy buildings owned by the U.S. government 
Conspiracy to provide material support and resources to Al-Qaeda.

Prosecutors and Ferdaus's defense attorneys agreed to recommend a 17-year sentence. On November 1, 2012, Judge Richard Stearns sentenced Ferdaus to 17 years in federal prison.

Ferdaus is incarcerated at the United States Penitentiary, Victorville, a high-security facility in California, and is scheduled for release in 2026.

Human Rights Watch

Ferdaus's arrest and prosecution has been criticized by Human Rights Watch, who state that he was incapable of carrying out the plans which were alleged. Ferdaus experienced severe physical and mental health issues leading up to his arrest, at one point requiring his father to quit his job to take care of him. The FBI knew about his mental health issues, but continued the operation.

See also
Farooque Ahmed
Amine El Khalifi
David Headley
Sami Osmakac
Faisal Shahzad

References

External links
FBI Press release
FBI Affidavit

1985 births
American Muslims
American people of Bangladeshi descent
21st-century American physicists
Living people
Northeastern University alumni